Vale is an offshore gas field in the North Sea located  north of the Heimdal gas field. Vale is considered a satellite to Heimdal field and is connected to it by a pipeline. 

History
Production was started on 31 May 2002, according to the Plan for Development and Operation approved by Norway in the spring of 2001. Total investment has been 800 million NOK which also included modifications on Heimdal, drilling operations, subsea templates and pipelines.

Ownership
The Vale field is operated by Sval Energi (50%) with LOTOS holding 25.757% and PGNiG holding 24.243%.

The field was originally operated by Norsk Hydro.  In 2007, the operationship was transferred to Statoil as a result of the merger between Statoil and Hydro Oil & Gas.  In 2012, Centrica acquired Statoil's stake and took over operatorship; Operatorship passed to Sval Energi upon their acquisition of Centrica's subsidiary, Spirit Energy's Norwegian assets in 2022.

See also

Heimdal gas field
Oseberg Transport System
Grane oil field
Oseberg oil field
North Sea oil
Economy of Norway

References

External links
 Vale – Equinor

Oil fields in Norway
Natural gas fields in Norway
North Sea energy
TotalEnergies
Centrica